P4W: Prison for Women is a Canadian documentary film, directed by Janis Cole and Holly Dale and released in 1981. The film profiles several female inmates at the Prison for Women of Kingston Penitentiary.

The film premiered at the 1981 Festival of Festivals, and was broadcast by CBC Television in 1982. The film won the Genie Award for Best Feature Length Documentary at the 3rd Genie Awards in 1982.

When the Prison for Women closed in 2000, Cole wrote a piece for the Toronto newspaper Now about her experiences making the film and her hopes for prison reform.

References

External links

1981 films
Canadian documentary films
Canadian prison films
Best Documentary Film Genie and Canadian Screen Award winners
Documentary films about women
Documentary films about the penal system in Canada
Films set in Ontario
Films directed by Janis Cole and Holly Dale
Women in Ontario
1980s Canadian films